Zarina Yeva (Kazakh: Зарина Ева) is a Kazakh actress and model based in the United States.

Biography

Early years and modeling 
Zarina Yeva began her modeling career after finishing her secondary education. After signing a contract with a Kazakh modeling agency, she participated in advertising campaigns for different brands and represented her country in the World Beauty Queen international contest held in South Korea, advancing to the final rounds. She has appeared on the covers and pages of magazines such as L'Officiel, Vogue (sharing the cover with the Kazakh model and singer Kristina Menissov), Maxim, Harper's Bazaar, Glamour and Elle; and has walked the runway at events such as the Miami Swim Week.

Acting 
After obtaining a master's degree in acting in the Kazakh National Academy of Arts, she moved to Moscow to start a career in acting. There she participated in films like Vremennye trudnosti by Mikhail Raskhodnikov (2018) and Cosmoball by Dzhanik Fayziev (2020). Other film productions where she has appeared include Rustem Abdrashev's Kazakh Khanate - Golden Throne —a film submitted by Kazakhstan to compete for the Academy Award for Best International Feature Film—, and Akan Satayev's Tomiris, among others. She is currently based in Los Angeles, California and New York City.

Filmography

Dubbing roles

References

External links 

 

Kazakhstani female models
Beauty pageant contestants
Year of birth missing (living people)
Living people
Kazakhstani actresses